Carpobrotus aequilaterus, common names: angled pigface, Chilean pigface, This species is thought to have originated in southern Africa (or possibly South America) and a naturalised weed elsewhere. However, according to VicFlora it is native to South Africa,
 It is also known as the sea fig.

The plant grows along the coast from sea level and up to 100 metres higher. It can be found in Chile, California, Mexico, and Australia. It is a naturalised weed in North America, New Zealand, and Australia (in New South Wales, Tasmania, Victoria, South Australia), and Western Australia).

Description
Carpobrotus aequilaterus has an edible fruit. The flavour is said to be like strawberry but they have a poor structure. The flowers are pollinated by bees although the flowers are hermaphrodite. The plants grow from 8 to 72 inches high.

References

External links
GBIF: Worldwide occurrence data for Carpobrotus aequilaterus

aequilaterus
Taxa named by N. E. Brown
Taxa named by Adrian Hardy Haworth